Jonathan R. Davis was an American gold rush prospector. On December 19, 1854, he single-handedly killed eleven armed outlaws at Rocky Canyon near Sacramento, California using two Colt revolvers and a Bowie knife. This episode became one of the deadliest small arms engagements in American history involving one man against multiple foes. Michael Trcic depicted the event in the sculpture "One Man With Courage is a Majority". He was educated at South Carolina College, where he was a member of the Euphradian Society.

The unit, the Palmetto Regiment of Volunteers, was accepted into federal service in December 1846 and disbanded at the close of the war in June and July 1848. Davis is listed as a second lieutenant in Mexican War Veterans: A Complete Roster of the Regular and Volunteer Troops ... By William Hugh Robarts (1887) who notes that he was wounded in the Battle of Churubusco. He was not alone in being wounded since five of his brother officers died and another eight were wounded in leading the regiment that day.  Among those who fell were Col. Pierce M. Butler (killed), Lt. Col. James P. Dickenson (mortally wounded), Adjutant 2nd Lt. James Cantey (severely wounded), Capt. Keith S. Moffat (wounded), Capt. William D. Desaussure (twice wounded), 1st Lt. James R. Clark (mortally wounded), 1st Lt. Kennedy G. Billings (severely wounded), 2nd Lt. Joseph Abney (severely wounded), 2nd Lt. David Adams (killed), 2nd Lt. Wilson R. Williams (killed), 2nd Lt. Sebastian Sumter (wounded), 2nd Lt. James W. Stein (wounded, and subsequently mortally wounded on 13 Sept. at Mexico City's Belén Gate gate and died 10 Oct.),  and 2nd Lt. George W. Curtis (wounded).

The fight
On December 19, 1854, while trekking on a miner's trail along the North Fork of the American River, Dr. Bolivar Sparks, James McDonald, and Captain Jonathan Davis were bushwhacked by an international band of bandits. The bandits, a Frenchman, two Americans, two Britons, four Mexicans, and four Australians, had robbed and killed four American miners on the previous day and six Chinese miners on the day before that. Several of the bandits were members of the Sydney Ducks gang.<ref>Bell, Bob Boze, "The Gang Slayer: Captain Jonathan Davis vs 14 Polyglot Kilers, True West; History of the American Frontier. June 2014, Vol. 61, No. 6</ref> McDonald was killed instantly and Dr. Sparks was fatally wounded; however, Captain Davis, an Army veteran, pulled out both of his pistols and killed seven of the bandits in short order. Out of bullets, Captain Davis, an expert fencer, pulled out his Bowie knife and killed four more of his attackers. The surviving bandits fled for their lives. The shootout was witnessed by a group of miners, who buried the bodies of the dead.

Afterwards
Some have suggested that Davis disappeared "into the sunset" after the episode, but "Jonathan Rutledge Davis" appears in California documents in the decades following his famous encounter as he continued his mining pursuits and other business ventures in several counties of northern California. Just a month after his battle he seems to be the "Jon. R. Davis" who was selected for a coroner's jury at Sonora on 18 January 1855. They heard six hours of evidence in the murder of Joseph Heslep, county treasurer of Tuolumne County, which resulted in the confession of Edward Crane Griffiths. The people of Sonora had seen enough of due process by that point, ignored Sheriff Solomon's plea for law and order, and hanged Griffiths the next day on the outskirts of town after he had been allowed to write two letters to his wife asking for her forgiveness (Daily Alta California, Volume 6, Number 20, 21 January 1855, reprinted from the Sonora Herald'').

A Jonathan Davis is found in the 1860 U.S. census for Township No. 2 in Placer County and perhaps was living in a boardinghouse since the names of the five residents are unrelated. This man was a miner, age 50, born in Virginia (page 144).  The name and occupation are accurate, the locale is in the gold country which is fitting, but his age is off by about six years (he should be 44) and his birth state is southern but not South Carolina. However, such inconsistencies in the census are common, especially if one person provided the information for the entire household.

A Jonathan Davis appears in federal tax records for 1862, '64, and '65 in Napa County. In the first two he was a cattle broker paying $10 and $4.10 respectively.  For the latter he is taxed on personal property of 1 carriage and one gold watch in Sonoma.

Davis is listed as a miner, age 60, in the 1875 Great Register of voters in for Scott Valley, Siskiyou County (this is the earliest extant document with his complete middle name Rutledge). In the 1877 Great Register for Douglas City, Trinity Co. his occupation listed as lawyer. There are two places where he appears in the 1880 U.S. census. For Township No. 2, Shasta County he is Jonathan R. Davis recorded in an apparent rooming house as age 64, single, of South Carolina birth, occupation miner, and with South Carolina as the birthplace of his parents (line 1984, page 24 B). However, he is also recorded in a rooming house as "Johnathan Davis" in nearby Weaverville, Trinity County with the same age, birthplace, and occupation; the birthplace of his father is then given as West Virginia and that of his mother is South Carolina (page 571 A).

In 1882 he is named "Jonathan R. Davis" in the Great Register again in Douglas City, Trinity County, incorrectly stated as age 62 but with correct birth state (page 3).  For the 1884 Great Register he gave the same version of his name in Shasta County, Shasta Township, age 68 and born in South Carolina (page 13). The Great Register of 19 Feb. 1886 uses his full middle name at Ophir Township, Butte County, age 70, also South Carolina birth, and he again is a miner (page 15). For 1888 his name appears as "Janathan Rutledge Davis" for the register in Yount, Napa County with an age of 72 and occupation lawyer.  His complete name is also used in the 1890 Great Register for "Homestead" in San Joaquin County with a somewhat inaccurate age of 77 but correct birth state and still a lawyer occupation (page 19).

In 1887 Davis received a veteran's pension for his service in the Mexican–American War.  His California application, number 8,007, was dated 31 March 1887, and he received certificate number 3,543 (GS Film number 537003, Digital Folder Number 005189112, Image Number 01802).  The application notes he served in company G of the Palmetto Regiment, South Carolina Volunteers.

See also
Davis Family Collection – Furman University Special Collections

John Boessenecker, Gold Dust and Gunsmoke: Tales of Gold Rush Outlaws, Gunfighters, Lawmen, and Vigilantes.  New York:  John Wiley & Sons (1999)

References

1816 births
American military personnel of the Mexican–American War
Gunslingers of the American Old West
People from Fairfield County, South Carolina
People of the California Gold Rush
Year of death missing